Gavella Drama Theatre is a Croatian theatre which is situated in Zagreb, in Frankopanska Street.

The theatre opened on October 30, 1954 as the successor of "Helios" cinema which was founded and financed by Croatian industrialist, Adolf Müller.

Drama ensemble
Lead by director Dražen Ferenčina, the drama ensemble of the Gavella Theatre includes Živko Anočić, Ivana Bolanča, Amar Bukvić, Nenad Cvetko, Franjo Dijak, Ankica Dobrić, Natalija Đorđević, Anja Đurinović, Zoran Gogić, Ozren Grabarić, Bojana Gregorić, Nataša Janjić, Hrvoje Klobučar, Slavica Knežević, Nela Kocsis, Igor Kovač, Filip Križan, Dražen Kühn, Đorđe Kukuljica, Ana Kvrgić, Mirjana Majurec, Perica Martinović, Sven Medvešek, Jelena Miholjević, Darko Milas, Barbara Nola, Ksenija Pajić, Janko Rakoš, Ivana Roščić, Siniša Ružić, Antonija Stanišić, Sven Šestak, Anja Šovagović-Despot, Filip Šovagović, Enes Vejzović, Dijana Vidušin and Ranko Zidarić.

References

External links
  

1954 establishments in Croatia
Theatres in Zagreb
Donji grad, Zagreb